Stanisław Łubieński (1573 in Łubna – 16 April 1640 in Wyszków), of Pomian coat of arms, was a Polish noble, politician and bishop. Royal Secretary of king Sigismund III of Poland from 1591; regent of Royal Chancellery from 1614, Crown Secretary, bishop of Łuck from 1622, Deputy Chancellor of the Crown from 1626 (to 1628) and bishop of Płock from 1627.

He was a Catholic priest and a strong supporter of counterreformation. Friend of the poet Maciej Sarbiewski, himself he was an author of many important historical chronicles of that period, among them a detailed description of rokosz of Zebrzydowski.

Selected works
Brevis narratio profectionis in Sueciam Sigismundi III..., 1593;
De ortu, vita et morte Mathiae de Bużenin Pstrokoński... (1630);
Ce motu civili in Polonia libri quatuor, Series. vitea, res gestes episcoporum Plocensium..., Kraków 1642;
'Opera posthuma historica historopolitica variigue discursus epistolae et aliquot orationes... (1643);
Droga do Szwecji;
Rozruchy domowe.

References

Ecclesiastical senators of the Polish–Lithuanian Commonwealth
1573 births
1640 deaths
17th-century Polish historians
Polish male non-fiction writers
17th-century Polish nobility
Bishops of Płock
Abbots of Tyniec
17th-century Roman Catholic bishops in the Polish–Lithuanian Commonwealth
People from Sieradz County
Crown Vice-Chancellors